Terras de Bouro is a municipality in the district of Braga in Portugal. The population in 2011 was 7,253, in an area of 277.46 km². It is bordered to the north by Ponte da Barca and Spain, to the east by Montalegre, to the south by Vieira do Minho, to the southwest by Amares, and to the west by Vila Verde.

The present Mayor is Manuel Tibo, elected by the PSD. The municipal holiday is 20 October, day that celebrates the granting of a charter by King D. Manuel I in 1514 .

History
The Germanic tribe of the Buri accompanied the Suebi in their invasion of the Iberian Peninsula and establishment in Gallaecia (modern northern Portugal). The Buri settled in the region between the rivers Cávado and Homem, in the area known thereafter as Terras de Boiro or Terras de Bouro (Lands of the Buri).

Parishes

Administratively, the municipality is divided into 14 civil parishes (freguesias):

 Balança
 Campo do Gerês
 Carvalheira
 Chamoim e Vilar
 Chorense e Monte
 Cibões e Brufe
 Covide
 Gondoriz
 Moimenta
 Ribeira
 Rio Caldo
 Souto
 Valdosende
 Vilar da Veiga

See also
Vilarinho da Furna

Notes

External links
Municipality official website

Towns in Portugal
Municipalities of Braga District